Sonográfica is a record label based in Caracas, Venezuela. It had links with Empresas 1BC, which also owned Radio Caracas Televisión (RCTV) and Radio Caracas Radio, among other businesses.

During the 1980s, it supported Venezuelan musical talent as the result of a national decree known as "One for One", which required radio stations to play one song performed by a Venezuelan artist for every foreign song. This way, numerous Venezuelan artists such as Ilan Chester, Maria Rivas, Daiquirí, Franco de Vita, Carlos Mata, Rudy La Scala, Yordano etc., were promoted locally and internationally.

The label always maintained a rivalry with its counterpart: the Cisneros Organisation, partners of  Rodven Discos and its affiliate, Sonorodven Distributors. Every release by the latter company resulted in a release from Sonográfica.

Sonográfica was solely a music-distributing company for the products coming from their pressing plant Sonoindustrial and which was often recorded in their own studio, Telearte Studios. Sonográfica's releases were very popular. Their alliances with Palacio and Velvet promoted a higher number of artists, and allow them to release music based on their catalog only. Later, due to the decline in the music market, the business was sold to another company.

Sonográfica is still active, but it is far from being the business that promoted national talent in Venezuela as it used to do in the past. Its operation has been affected by the increase in piracy and by the absence of a link with the Empresas 1BC, which provided support in their early days.

Sonografica was purchased by the company of Alvaro Veli to become Sonografica Music Digital operating from Madrid Spain. It acquired all the catalog of original masters of music in Caracas, Venezuela, under the brand Sonografica Music & Distribuidora Sonografica Digital.

Controversies
Sonográfica, along with its counterpart Rodven Discos, did not escape censure and controversy caused by many of its releases. Some examples include:

In 1990, former President Carlos Andrés Pérez prohibited the playing on air of the Christmas song "La Gata Blanca" ("The White Cat"). Public opinion supposed that the prohibition, more than for its political content (it attacked two political figures), occurred because of two words which were spoken in the song.
In 1991, the CD "Las Odas de Emilio Lovera" ("The Odes of Emilio Lovera"), produced by the comedian Laureano Márquez and interpreted by his colleague Emilio Lovera was vetted and those responsible for it were investigated by the Ministry of Transport and Communications. The reason given was that this album was offensive to the President, as well as to many other political figures.
In 1994, after pop singer Ricardo Montaner fell out with his record label, Sonorodven, Sonográfica took him under its wing. This occurrence caused a legal dispute between the two companies, and increased the struggle that existed between them for over 14 years.

References

Record label distributors